Kairo Coore (born January 12, 2001) is a Canadian professional soccer player who plays for Western Suburbs FC in the New Zealand Central League.

Early life
Coore began playing soccer at age four with Ajax SC, later joining Erin Mills SC.

College career
In 2019, he began attending Saginaw Valley State University, playing for the men's soccer team. In 2019, he had nine goals and five assists, ranking third in the conference in goals and fifth in points, while in 2020 season, Coore scored four goals and three assists in six games.

In 2021, he returned to Canada, joining Cape Breton University. He chose to return to Canada, as he felt being eligible for the CPL-U Sports Draft would improve his chances of a professional career. He scored four goals in a match against the Acadia Axemen on September 26, earning AUS male athlete of the week honours. In his first season for the Capers, he led the nation with 15 goals, also adding one assist, in 12 games. He was named an AUS First Team All-star and was named MVP of the 2021 AUS Championship, helping the Capers win the conference title. He was also named a Second Team All-Canadian.

Club career
Coore was selected second overall by Canadian Premier League club FC Edmonton in the 2022 CPL-U Sports Draft. In March, he signed a developmental contract with the club for the 2022 season. He made his debut on April 10, in a substitute appearance against Valour FC. He scored his first professional goal on May 31 against Forge FC. In August, he departed the club, returning to university, as part of his developmental contract.

In February 2023, he joined New Zealand Central League club Western Suburbs FC, via their partnership with Olé Football Academy.

Career statistics

External links

Kaior Coore Saginaw Valley State profile
Kairo Coore CBU Capers profile

References

2001 births
Living people
Association football forwards
Canadian soccer players
Soccer people from Ontario
People from Ajax, Ontario
Canadian expatriate soccer players
Expatriate soccer players in the United States
Canadian expatriate sportspeople in the United States
Saginaw Valley State Cardinals men's soccer players
Cape Breton Capers soccer players
FC Edmonton players
FC Edmonton draft picks
Canadian Premier League players